The Zabu Kun-Cha (also spelled Zambu Kungya) is a late 14th to early 15th century court treatise on Burmese statecraft and court organization. The text also includes a section on early history of Myanmar, which mentions several settlements across Myanmar that map to the archaeologically known Pyu settlements. About half of the 18th century court treatise Mani Yadanabon comes from the Zabu.

Brief
The Zabu Kun-Cha Kyan ("Treatise of Casting the Net over the Zabudipa") is a compilation of famous advice offered by Chief Minister Min Yaza to kings Swa Saw Ke (r. 1367−1400) and Minkhaung I (r. 1400−22) of Ava. The authorship of the text is usually attributed to the minister himself. "Each section typically begins with the king seeking advice on a historical problem," which is then followed by the minister's advice or submissions, supported by "a wealth of didactic examples from religious and historical literature".

The text also includes a section on early history of Myanmar, which mentions several settlements across Myanmar that map to the archaeologically known Pyu settlements. It covers a sequence of capitals of ancient Myanmar, starting with the Pyu city of Halin, followed by Ava (Inwa), Mekkhaya, Pinle, Kaungsin, Allagappa, Legaing, Tagaung, Sri Ksetra, Pagan (Bagan), Myinsaing−Mekkhaya−Pinle, Ava, Pinya, Sagaing and Ava. The list is quite different from those of the standard chronicles, of which Hmannan in particular. Zabu is an early written text that mentions the spread of the Pyu city-states throughout the Irrawaddy valley from Tagaung to Sri Ksetra, and into the Panlaung and lower Mu and Chindwin valleys. According to Hudson, Zabu's authors apparently were aware that "the sites they listed all had some kind of archaeological evidence of antiquity. Kaungsin, Allagappa and Legaing, not prominent in other chronicles, were known to the author(s) when the Zabu was written."

While the text mainly deals with the precedents of Min Yaza, because of its historical sections, some scholars classify it a chronicle while others do not. The Zabu was later included in the 1781 treatise Mani Yadanabon, which also includes advice by later ministers. The Zabu portion represents "somewhat half under the total". It is through the Mani Yadanabon that the full text of Zabu or what is believed to be Zabu has survived. Only a portion of an 1825 copy of Zabu has survived. The surviving text was translated to English by U Pe in 1959; another version was translated in 2004 by Thaung Lwin with editorial input from Win Maung.

Notes

References

Bibliography
 
 
 
 
 
 
 

Burmese chronicles
Burmese literature